The 1948–49 NCAA men's ice hockey season began in November 1948 and concluded with the 1949 NCAA Men's Ice Hockey Tournament's championship game on March 19, 1949 at the Broadmoor Ice Palace in Colorado Springs, Colorado. This was the 2nd season in which an NCAA ice hockey championship was held and is the 55th year overall where an NCAA school fielded a team.

Regular season

Season tournaments

Standings

1949 NCAA Tournament

Player stats

Scoring leaders
The following players led the league in points at the conclusion of the season.

GP = Games played; G = Goals; A = Assists; Pts = Points; PIM = Penalty minutes

Leading goaltenders
The following goaltenders led the league in goals against average at the end of the regular season while playing at least 33% of their team's total minutes.

GP = Games played; Min = Minutes played; W = Wins; L = Losses; OT = Overtime/shootout losses; GA = Goals against; SO = Shutouts; SV% = Save percentage; GAA = Goals against average

Awards

NCAA

References

External links
College Hockey Historical Archives
1948–49 NCAA Standings

 
NCAA